Miklós Tuss (5 September 1898 – 25 April 1978) was a sailor from Hungary, who represented his country at the 1928 Summer Olympics in Amsterdam, Netherlands.

Sources 
 

Sailors at the 1928 Summer Olympics – 6 Metre
Olympic sailors of Hungary
Hungarian male sailors (sport)
1898 births
1978 deaths
Sportspeople from Békés County